Per-user unitary rate control (PU2RC) is a multi-user MIMO (multiple-input and multiple-output) scheme. PU2RC uses both transmission pre-coding and multi-user scheduling. By doing that, the network capacity is further enhanced than the capacity of the single-user MIMO scheme.

 Background technologies: A single-user MIMO was initially developed to improve the spectral efficiency of point-to-point wireless transmission link. A multi-user MIMO was developed for cellular systems where the base station simultaneously communicates with multiple users.
 Principle: The concept of Per-User Unitary Rate Control (PU2RC) was proposed in US Patent No. 7,324,480, Mobile communication apparatus and method including base station and mobile station having multi-antenna by James S. Kim, Kwang Bok Lee, Kiho Kim and Changsoon Park.

Recently, PU2RC has been adopted in the IEEE 802.16m system description documentation (SDD) and the concept of this scheme was included in 3GPP LTE standard.

Technology
Per-user unitary rate control (PU2RC) is a practical multi-user MIMO solution. PU2RC allows a base station to transmit different data streams to multiple users simultaneously. The base station selects target users from candidate users based on the information fed by users. Transmission data are multiplied by a pre-coding matrix selected from the set of predefined matrices before transmission. The selection of a pre-coding matrix is determined based on the information provided by users. The selection of both target users and a pre-coding matrix according to the information provided by mobiles enables the utilization of multi-user diversity and data multiplexing at the same time. Moreover, using predefined precoding matrices reduces feedback overhead from users to the base station. Pre-coding matrices used in this scheme is unitary. The use of unitary pre-coding matrices facilitates the estimation of interference from other users' data to the unintended user.

Mathematical description
The operation of PU2RC is mathematically described for the transmitter and receiver sides, respectively.

Base station
It is assumed that the base station employs  transmission antennas. The  transmission signal vector is given by

where  is the  linear precoding vector. PU2RC generates  based on the received finite channel status information, which is delivered to the base station from the user equipment (UE) through uplink feedback signaling. The feedback signal consists of index in a look-up table of a precoding codebook.

Receiver side
Every receiver has a receive antenna array with  elements. The receive signal vector at user  is modeled as follows:

Throughput performance
The figure illustrates the throughput advantage of PU2RC over the conventional single-user and no scheduling scheme, assuming that the codebook size is one, i.e., . For larger codebook sizes the performance can be better than the performance of the unit-size codebook. Because of codebook-based multi-user scheduling, PU2RC outperforms the conventional single-user and no scheduling scheme when the number of users is larger than one. Note that the performance plotted in the figure for the two systems were obtained assuming linear receiver.

See also

 Multiple-input multiple-output communications
 Multi-user MIMO as the advanced MIMO communication technology
 Precoding
 Spatial multiplexing

References

 James S. Kim, K. B. Lee, et al., Mobile communication apparatus and method including base station and mobile station having multi-antenna, US PTO 7,324,480
 S. J. Kim, H. J. Kim, C. S. Park, and K. B. Lee, "On the Performance of Multiuser MIMO Systems in WCDMA/HSDPA: Beamforming, Feedback and User Diversity," IEICE Transactions on Communications, vol. E98-B, no. 8, pp. 2161–2169, Aug. 2006.
 3GPP TSG RAN WG1#31 R1-030354, Per unitary basis stream user and rate Control (PU2RC), 3GPP TSG-R1-030354, Tokyo, Fed 18–21, 2003. (See also R1-030130)
 Samsung, SNU, "Downlink MIMO for EUTRA," in 3GPP TSG RAN WG1 # 44/R1-060335
 Multiuser MIMO Scheme for Enhanced 3GPP HSDPA
 Kim, J.S., Hojin Kim, Yongxing Zhou, Jianjun Li, '`Multi-Mode Multi-User MIMO System with Finite Rate Feedback, IEEE Wireless Communication Systems, 2006. ISWCS '06. 3rd International Symposium on, 6–8 Sep 2006
 R. W. Heath, Jr., M. Airy, and A. J. Paulraj, "Multiuser Diversity for MIMO Wireless Systems with Linear Receivers," Proc. of the IEEE Asilomar Conf. on Signals, Systems, and Computers, pp. 1194 –1199, vol.2, Pacific Grove, California, 4–7 Nov 2001.
 A. Kogiantis and L. Ozarow, "Downlink best-effort packet data with multiple antennas," ICC'03, Volume 1, 11–15 May 2003 Page(s):715 – 719.
 K.K. Wong, R.D. Murch and K.B. Letaief, "Performance Enhancement of Multiuser MIMO Wireless Communication Systems," IEEE Transactions on Communications, Vol 50 No 12, Dec. 2002, pp 1960 –1970
 Further benefits of the revised definition of CQI for TxAA, 3GPP TSG-R1-030130, San Diego, 7–10 Jan. 2003.

Further reading
 D. Gesbert, M. Kountouris, R W. Heath Jr., C. B. Chae, T. Sälzer, From Single User to Multiuser Communications: Shifting the MIMO Paradigm
 V. Poor, Multiuser MIMO Systems
Dr. Jacob Sharony, "Introduction to Wireless MIMO – Theory and Applications", IEEE LI, 15 November 2006 
Daniel W. Bliss, Keith W. Forsythe, and Amanda M. Chan, MIMO Wireless Communication, VOLUME 15, NUMBER 1, 2005 LINCOLN LABORATORY JOURNAL

IEEE 802
Information theory
Radio resource management